TAP Air Portugal was founded as a division of Portugal's Civil Aviation Department under the name Transportes Aéreos Portugueses on 14 March 1945, and started operations on 19 September 1946, initially serving the Lisbon–Madrid route using the Douglas DC-3. A year later, the carrier added a route to Angola and Mozambique, at the time claimed to be the world's longest route operated with a DC-3, having 13 intermediate stops.

By , the carrier's network consisted of the long-haul Lisbon–Kano–Leopoldville–Luanda–Lourenço Marques route, as well as medium- and short-haul routes radiating from Lisbon and serving Casablanca, London, Madrid, Paris and Tangier, and a single domestic flight between Lisbon and Oporto. On 1 November 1962, the airline started services between Lisbon and London, flying the route using the Sud Aviation Caravelle, taking over the services that had been operated by British European Airways on behalf of the company.

, TAP Portugal was the European airline with the most destinations in Brazil (10), being the leader in terms of passengers transported between this country and Europe, in comparison with their European counterparts, as well as with the Brazilian ones. Data from the latest financial report, corresponding to the fiscal year 2012, showed that the airline had its main source of traffic in Europe, and their most important long-haul market was South America.

Apart from Brazil, the countries with the most destinations served by the carrier are Spain (7), France (6) and Germany (5). TAP Portugal also flies to other 25 international destinations in Europe, 15 in Africa,  in the United States and one more in Latin America (Caracas). In the end of 2013, TAP announced its plan to start flying to  additional destinations in Europe during 2014 (Nantes, Hannover, Tallinn, Gothenburg, Belgrade and Saint Petersburg), whose schedule was announced prior to 31 March 2014. , the number of destinations in Brazil served by the carrier increased to 12 with the addition of Belém and Manaus to the route network. During , TAP Portugal launched services to Belgrade, Bogotá, Gothenburg, Hanover, Nantes, Oviedo, Panama City, Saint Petersburg and Tallinn.


List
TAP Portugal's route network included 84 destinations in 35 countries, . Following is a list of destinations the airline flies to according to its scheduled services. It also includes cities served by the airline's subsidiaries Portugália and TAP Express, as well as terminated destinations.

References

Further reading

Lists of airline destinations
TAP Air Portugal
Star Alliance destinations